The 2015–16 season was Gabala FK's 11th season, and their 10th in the Azerbaijan Premier League, the top-flight of Azerbaijani football. Domestically, Gabala finished 3rd in the Premier League for the third season in a row and reached the Semifinals of the Azerbaijan Cup where they were defeated by Neftchi Baku. In Europe Gabala reached the Group Stages of the UEFA Europa League where they faced PAOK, Krasnodar and Borussia Dortmund before finishing bottom of the group.

Season review 
In September 2015, Gabala announced a new one-year shirt sponsorship deal with QafqaZ Hotels and Resorts.

Transfers 
The summer transfer window saw a lot of transfer movement from Gabala, with 14 players leaving the club and 9 players arriving. The most notable departures were the club's all-time leading goalscorer Victor Mendy returning to France, Ruslan Fomin moving to FC Atyrau in Kazakhstan, and Ekigho Ehiosun returning to parent club Gençlerbirliği S.K. Alexandru Benga, Ruslan Abışov, Adrian Ropotan, Pavol Farkaš and Mikhail Sivakow also left the clubs at the end of their contracts.

Arif Dashdemirov, Magomed Mirzabekov, Asif Mammadov all joined from Inter Baku PIK permanently, whilst Vojislav Stanković also joined from Inter Baku on an 18-month loan deal. Andrey Popovich and Samir Zargarov also joined from other Azerbaijan Premier League clubs,  Sumgayit FK and Simurq PFC respectively. Sergei Zenjov moved from recently relegated Russian Premier League side FC Torpedo Moscow, Vitaliy Vernydub from FC Zorya Luhansk, Oleksiy Antonov from FC Aktobe, and George Florescu from Astra Giurgiu.

Transfers

Summer

In:

Out:

Winter

In:

 

Out:

Squad

Out on loan

Friendlies

Competitions

Azerbaijan Premier League

Results summary

Results

League table

Azerbaijan Cup

UEFA Europa League

Qualifying rounds

Group stage

Squad statistics

Appearances and goals

|-
|colspan="14"|Players away from Gabala on loan:
|-
|colspan="14"|Players who appeared for Gabala no longer at the club:

|}

Goal scorers

Disciplinary record

Notes 

Qarabağ have played their home games at the Tofiq Bahramov Stadium since 1993 due to the ongoing situation in Quzanlı.
Gabala played their second & third qualifying round home matches at the Bakcell Arena, Baku, instead of their regular stadium City Stadium, Qabala, due to a punishment by UEFA.
Apollon Limassol play their home matches at Antonis Papadopoulos Stadium, Larnaca, instead of their regular stadium Tsirion Stadium, Limassol.
Gabala played their home matches at Bakcell Arena, Baku instead of their regular stadium, Gabala City Stadium, Qabala.
The match between Gabala and Kapaz on 31 October 2015, was suspended in 29th minute due to server fog. The remainder of the game was played the next day, 1 November 2015, at 20:00.

References

External links 
Gabala FC Website
Gabala FC at UEFA.com
Gabala FC at Soccerway.com
Gabala FC at National Football Teams.com

Gabala FC seasons
Azerbaijani football clubs 2015–16 season
Gabala